Sibogasyrinx sangeri is a species of sea snail, a marine gastropod mollusc in the family Cochlespiridae.

Description
The length of the shell attains 54.1 mm.

Distribution
This marine species was found off Papua New Guinea (depth range: 575 -655 m.).

References

External links
 Kantor Yu.I., Fedosov A.E. & Puillandre N. (2018). New and unusual deep-water Conoidea revised with shell, radula and DNA characters. Ruthenica. 28(2): 47-82
 Kantor, Y.I. & Puillandre, N. (2021). Rare, deep-water and similar: revision of Sibogasyrinx (Conoidea: Cochlespiridae). European Journal of Taxonomy. 773: 19-60

sangeri
Gastropods described in 2018